Labzov is a Russian and Belarus surname.

Labzov may also refer to:
Leonid Labzov, Soviet and Russian ice hockey player
Artsiom Labzov, Belarus ice hockey referee